The Patriotic Coalition was a political alliance in Croatia formed in 2015. The parties signed the coalition agreement on 21 September 2015. On 2015 parliamentary election, coalition won a relative majority in 5 of the 10 constituencies in Croatia, and all 3 seats reserved for the Croatian diaspora, and thus received a total of 59 of the 151 parliamentary seats, with its main competitor center-left Croatia is Growing coalition also winning a relative majority in 5 of the 10 constituencies in Croatia, and 56 of the 151 parliamentary seats. After more than 40 days of negotiations with the Bridge of Independent Lists (MOST) and numerous twists and turns mainly due to MOST frequently changing terms, coalition achieved agreement with MOST and Milan Bandić 365 - The Party of Labour and Solidarity on forming new government with Prime Minister being independent Tihomir Orešković.

Presidents of several coalition party members stated in 2016 that communication among coalition members is bad, with some expressing dissatisfaction with Governments' announced reforms.

On June 16, 2016, Coalition supported Cabinet of Tihomir Orešković lost a motion of no confidence in the Croatian Parliament, which was followed by the Parliament's self-dissolution on June 20, 2016 which triggered early election that was held in September 2016.

On July 7, 2016, 1.500 members of the Croatian Party of Rights dr. Ante Starčević left the party because of their dissatisfaction of how the party was run, accusing it of "becoming a spokesman for HDZ". On the same day, Main Committee of the Croatian Peasant Party made a decision that they would leave the Coalition and join coalition led by center-left Social Democratic Party of Croatia.

On July 25, 2016, HDZ announced that it would leave the Coalition.

Former members
The coalition consisted of ten parties:

History

European parliament
Early versions of the coalition participated in a joint list for elections to the European Parliament in 2013 and 2014.

See also 
 2015 Croatian parliamentary election

References

External links

2015 establishments in Croatia
2016 disestablishments in Croatia
Croatian Democratic Union
Defunct political party alliances in Croatia